is a Japanese actress, voice actress and singer from Yokohama, Kanagawa.

Career
In August 2001, Tamaki Matsumoto entered the Theater Academy. She debuted in October 2002, with the stage performance Teruteru no Teruko. In 2007, she received attention for her regular appearances in the TV dramas My Fairboy and Kamen Rider Den-O. She transferred from the Theater Academy (Cosmos Theater Company) to AT Production, an affiliated production company, in 2010.

She retired in April 2011 to dedicate more time to her academic life, especially to prepare for her secondary school entrance examination. In April 2017, she enrolled at Meiji Gakuin University in the Faculty of International Studies. On July 10 of the same year, she entered the Miss Meiji Gakuin Contest 2017. She was the DHC Award winner.

On September 14, 2017, Matsumoto made a surprise appearance on the talk show Farewell Kamen Rider Den-O Final Countdown Director's Cut Edition held in Tokyo.

Filmography

Anime
Code Geass: Lelouch of the Rebellion R2 as Tianzi
Les Misérables - Shoujo Cosette as Cosette (3 years old)

Live action
Kamen Rider Den-O as Kohana (33–49)
Kamen Rider Decade as Kohana (14–15)
Ultraman Mebius as Eiko

Film
Doraemon: Nobita's New Great Adventure into the Underworld as Miyoko Mangetsu (Child)
Doraemon: Nobita and the Green Giant Legend as Girl watering cans
Kamen Rider Den-O Series as Kohana
Kamen Rider Den-O & Kiva: Climax Deka
Farewell, Kamen Rider Den-O: Final Countdown
Cho Kamen Rider Den-O & Decade Neo Generations: The Onigashima Warship
Kamen Rider × Kamen Rider × Kamen Rider The Movie: Cho-Den-O Trilogy
20th Century Boys – Live Movie as Yukiji (young)
Keroro Gunso the Super Movie: Creation! Ultimate Keroro, Wonder Space-Time Island

Stage
Sailor Moon musicals as Ami Mizuno (young)

Dubbing roles
Up as Young Ellie (Elizabeth "Elie" Docter)

Discography

Singles
(2010/06/02) Kuttsuke Hattsuke Wonderland, Keroro Gunso's 17th ending.
Tenshi Teki Kenpou Yonjou, source unknown.

References

External links
 Official agency profile 
 
 

1999 births
Living people
Actresses from Yokohama
Japanese child actresses
Japanese film actresses
Japanese musical theatre actresses
Japanese television actresses
Japanese voice actresses
Voice actresses from Yokohama
21st-century Japanese actresses